The LIPNUR B-8m Kindjeng was a prototype sports biplane built in Indonesia. it was powered by a Lycoming O-320 engine.

References
 

Indonesian sport aircraft
Biplanes